Sobibor, October 14, 1943, 4 p.m. is a 2001 French documentary film directed by Claude Lanzmann. It was screened out of competition at the 2001 Cannes Film Festival. The title and date refer to the Sobibor revolt, one of only two successful uprisings at a Nazi extermination camp during the Second World War (the other being at Treblinka).

See also
 List of Holocaust films
 Sobibór extermination camp

References

Further reading

External links

2001 films
2000s French-language films
Hebrew-language films
French documentary films
Films directed by Claude Lanzmann
Documentary films about the Holocaust
Sobibor extermination camp
2001 documentary films
Films about Jewish resistance during the Holocaust
2000s French films